Basketball is the regular Asian Games sport since the first edition in Delhi 1951. The Asian Games tournaments were the de facto Asian championships until the Asian Basketball Confederation Championship was founded in 1960.

Men's tournaments

Summaries

Per nation

Participating nations

Women's tournaments

Summaries

Participating nations

Per nation

Men's 3-on-3 tournaments

Summaries

Participating nations

Per nation

Women's 3-on-3 tournaments

Summaries

Participating nations

Per nation

Total medal table

External links
Medallists from previous Asian Games - Basketball

 
Sports at the Asian Games
Asian Games
Asian Games